Haverhill is an unincorporated community in Butler County, Kansas, United States.

History
A post office was opened in Haverhill in 1880, and remained in operation until it was discontinued in 1933.

Haverhill was a station and shipping point on the St. Louis–San Francisco Railway.

Education
The community is served by Bluestem USD 205 public school district.

References

Further reading

External links
 Butler County maps: Current, Historic, KDOT

Unincorporated communities in Butler County, Kansas
Unincorporated communities in Kansas